The Line is a 2009 play by British dramatist Timberlake Wertenbaker about the relationship between Edgar Degas and Suzanne Valadon. Set in  " the intimate, if quarrelsome world of Montmartre", at the play's heart are "a leading artist, a protegee and a clash between traditions, lifestyles and eras." The 2009 London production of the play starred Henry Goodman as Degas and Sarah Smart as Valadon.

Wertenbaker has stated that she began with Valadon because someone had given her a biography which she found fascinating. In the biography she came across Degas and the relationship between the two intrigued Wertenbaker.

Valadon called Degas the Master, but Wertenbaker believes he also learned from her: He loved her drawings and he did imitate them...I think he may also have learned other things from her; that there was another way of living, that there was another way of being that was very attractive.
It's hard to imagine that he spent as much time as he did with her and spoke of her so warmly and wanted to see her so much if he didn't get something from her because Degas was somebody who was very curious and didn't suffer fools gladly.

References

2009 plays
Plays based on real people
Plays set in the 19th century
Cultural depictions of Edgar Degas
British plays
Plays set in France
Montmartre
Suzanne Valadon